City of Leeds, West Yorkshire is a large city in England that includes several separate towns and villages and many other identifiable areas.

Divisions of Leeds
The metropolitan borough is divided into 33 wards, each of which elects three members of Leeds City Council.  The ward boundaries were last reorganised in 2004.  A map of the wards is available on the council website, as is a postcode-to-ward tool. Leeds is represented by eight Members of Parliament.  Since boundary changes made before the 2010 general election, the constituencies are Elmet and Rothwell, Leeds Central, Leeds East, Leeds North East, Leeds North West, Leeds West, Morley and Outwood (three out of five wards) and Pudsey. The constituency boundaries coincide with ward boundaries, so that each constituency comprises four or five complete wards; the Morley and Outwood constituency includes three Leeds wards and two Wakefield wards.

Leeds City Council divides the city into ten "Management areas" (Inner and Outer areas of North West, North East, East, South and West), which are included in this table to give a way to sort places into those ten geographical groups. Leeds is largely covered by LS post codes, most but not all of which have Leeds as their Post town to be used in postal addresses. Parts of the city have BD (Bradford) or WF (Wakefield) post codes, and some LS post codes are outside the city (in particular LS24 covering Tadcaster and  LS29 covering Ilkley). The council provides a map of postcode areas.

The city's current boundaries came into being on 1 April 1974, set by the Local Government Act 1972.  Before this, there existed a smaller County Borough of Leeds, and parts of today's city were in various other administrative areas.   Leeds includes part or all of the former  Municipal Boroughs of Morley and Pudsey, the Rural Districts of Tadcaster, Wetherby and Wharfedale, and the Urban Districts of Aireborough, Garforth, Horsforth, Otley and Rothwell.

List

Click the symbol in the column heading to sort.

References

 
Places